Gannan may refer to the following locations in China:

Gannan County, Qiqihar, Heilongjiang
Gannan Tibetan Autonomous Prefecture, Gansu
Gannan Xiahe Airport, serving Gannan Tibetan Autonomous Prefecture
Ganzhou, which is often referred to as "Gannan"